Chiliotrichum is a genus of flowering plants in the family Asteraceae.

 Species
 Chiliotrichum angustifolium Phil. - Chile
 Chiliotrichum diffusum (G.Forst.) Kuntze - Chile, Argentina, Falkland Islands (Islas Malvinas) 
 Chiliotrichum rosmarinifolium Less. - Chile, Argentina
 Chiliotrichum tenue Phil. - Chile

References 

Asteraceae genera
Astereae